Jay Oliva is an American storyboard artist, film producer and animated film director working at Los Angeles-based animation studio Lex+Otis.

Career 
Oliva first started in animation as a cleanup artist for the animated Fox TV series Spider-Man in 1996, where he eventually started his career as a storyboard artist. He then moved to Sony Animation in 1997 and storyboarded on Extreme Ghostbusters. He would stay at Sony for the next five years where he worked on Godzilla: The Series and then eventually becoming a director on the animated TV series Roughnecks: The Starship Troopers Chronicles which was then followed by Heavy Gear and Max Steel. Before leaving Sony, he storyboarded on Jackie Chan Adventures. He went on to work as storyboard supervisor on the Mike Young Productions/Mattel series He-Man and the Masters of the Universe and the follow up Masters of the Universe vs. the Snake Men. He was then hired as a storyboard artist for the first season of the hit series The Batman, after which then moved back to Sony Animation to direct the last season of Jackie Chan Adventures.

While at Sony, he worked as storyboard artist on Stuart Little 3: Call of the Wild in 2005. After working on a few DC animated TV series including Teen Titans and Justice League, he then moved to the Marvel/Lionsgate studios where he directed The Invincible Iron Man and Doctor Strange: The Sorcerer Supreme. After which, he was then hired by The Walt Disney Company to storyboard on the critically acclaimed children's series My Friends Tigger & Pooh. During this period he also worked as a storyboard artist on Superman: Doomsday before moving one last time back to Marvel to direct Marvel Animation's Next Avengers: Heroes of Tomorrow.

He worked as a storyboard artist on Marvel's Hulk Vs and DC's Wonder Woman, both of which were deemed successful. After working on six other DC Comics projects such as Green Lantern: First Flight, Superman/Batman: Public Enemies, Justice League: Crisis on Two Earths, Batman: Under the Red Hood, Superman/Batman: Apocalypse and All-Star Superman, he was asked to once again direct an animated film but this time for WB/DC, Green Lantern: Emerald Knights which received many positive reviews. He also went on to direct many episodes of the hit Young Justice TV series. He also worked on the Disney XD/Marvel Animation animated series The Avengers: Earth's Mightiest Heroes.

In late 2012, he was assigned by Warner Bros. Animation to direct a two-part animated film, Batman: The Dark Knight Returns, based on the comic book series of the same name by Frank Miller. Part 1 received a 100% score by Rotten Tomatoes.

In 2013, he, along with Zack Snyder, storyboarded his first live-action feature film, Man of Steel, after which he was tasked to make Justice League: The Flashpoint Paradox, based on the comic crossover Flashpoint by Geoff Johns, which received generally positive reviews. He was then tasked to helm the next animated movie, based on the New 52, Justice League: War, released in 2013, adapting the branding's first Justice League story arc. He would also, alongside Son of Batman director Ethan Spaulding, co-direct Batman: Assault on Arkham released in 2014, set in the Batman: Arkham video game series.

Spaulding replaced Oliva as director for the sequel Justice League: Throne of Atlantis, based on the Justice League/Aquaman storyline of the same name also by Geoff Johns. Oliva then directed the film Batman vs. Robin, released in 2016, before joining Zack Snyder in storyboarding his live-action film  Batman v Superman: Dawn of Justice, set in the DC Extended Universe. Oliva returned to directing for Warner Bros. Animation with Batman: Bad Blood.

His first work in the Marvel Cinematic Universe was help storyboarding on Peyton Reed's live-action adaptation of Ant-Man in 2015, as well as Tim Miller's live-action adaptation of Deadpool released in 2016, set in the X-Men film series.

Oliva has also worked as a storyboard artist on multiple episodes of The CW's live-action TV adaptation of The Flash.

In 2016, Oliva directed  Justice League Dark, the first animated DC movie with an R rating and would be released digitally on January 24, 2017.

Throughout 2016, Oliva was splitting his time directing for WB/DC animated films and storyboarding live-action films and commercials. However, by August 29, 2017, Oliva clarified he is no longer working for Warner Bros., thus making Justice League Dark his final work with them and DC.

In Singapore on November 8, 2018, Netflix announced it will produce an anime series adaptation of the graphic novel 
Trese by Filipino comic writer and artist Budjette Tan, as announced by Taito Okiura. Oliva is attached to the project as an executive producer. Set in Manila where mythical creatures of Philippine folklore live in hiding amongst humans, Alexandra Trese finds herself going head-to-head with a criminal underworld composed of malevolent supernatural beings.

Oliva will reunite with Zack Snyder to develop an anime series based on Norse mythology for Netflix, as well as an Army of the Dead anime prequel series, for which Oliva will serve as showrunner. Oliva is attached to an Court of the Dead anime series as well.

Personal life 
Oliva studied at Servite High School before graduating and going to Loyola Marymount University.

References

External links
 
 Official Twitter

Living people
American animated film directors
American storyboard artists
1976 births